TMSP may refer to:
 Telecom & Management SudParis, a group of two French Grande Ecole located in Évry, France
 Trimethylsilyl propionate, a solvent serving as internal reference in the spectrum in nuclear magnetic resonance
 Temple Mount Sifting Project, an archaeological project in Jerusalem.